Randy Gazzola (born September 13, 1993) is a Canadian professional ice hockey defenceman. He is currently playing for the HC Asiago in the ICE Hockey League. He previously played amateur for the UNB Varsity Reds of the AUS and at the junior level with the Val-d'Or Foreurs of the Quebec Major Junior Hockey League (QMJHL).

Playing career
Gazzola played in the QMJHL for 3 seasons  2012–13 to 2013–14, was rewarded for his outstanding play when he was named to the 2013–14 QMJHL First All-Star Team.

After his junior career, Randy went on to play CIS university hockey at the University of New Brunswick Varsity Reds. Randy made an immediate impact at UNB, being selected as the conference Rookie of the Year as well as being selected to the  CIS All-Rookie team. He helped UNB to the 2015 University Cup final before losing to defending champion Alberta Golden Bears 6-3. Randy won a CIS national title (University Cup) with UNB the next season, March 2016, when they defeated their AUS rivals St. Francis Xavier X-Men 3-1 in the Championship final.

On January 13, 2021, Gazzola joined his second ECHL club, agreeing to a contract for the 2020–21 season with the Fort Wayne Komets.

Awards and honours

References

External links 

1993 births
Living people
Canadian ice hockey defencemen
Fort Wayne Komets players
Grand Rapids Griffins players
New Brunswick Varsity Reds ice hockey players
Ritten Sport players
Toledo Walleye players
Val-d'Or Foreurs players